Frank Sacka (August 30, 1924 – December 7, 1994) was an American professional baseball player.

Born in Romulus, Michigan, the same hometown of future MLB catcher and batting coach Charley Lau, Sacka joined the professional baseball ranks in 1946 and played through the 1956 season. After spending his first five pro years in the St. Louis Browns' and Cleveland Indians' farm systems, Sacka was selected by Washington in the Rule 5 draft after a stellar 1950 campaign with the Anderson Rebels of the Class B Tri-State League, in which Sacka batted .324 with 23 home runs and 124 runs batted in. In his MLB debut on April 29, 1951, Sacka went hitless in three at bats as the starting catcher in a game against Ed Lopat and the New York Yankees at Yankee Stadium. Eight days later, he enjoyed his best day in the Majors, collecting three singles in five at-bats with two runs batted in against his former organization, the Indians, helping Washington win, 11–10.

He stuck with the Senators through the end of May, then was optioned to the Double-A Chattanooga Lookouts, where he would spend most of the next five seasons. However, he was recalled to Washington in late July 1953 and appeared in seven more MLB games. He collected two hits in two of them, against the Browns (another former employer) and the Yankees. Altogether, Sacka collected nine hits, all singles, in 34 MLB at bats during his 14-game career.

References

External links
, or Retrosheet

1924 births
1994 deaths
Anderson Rebels players
Atlanta Crackers players
Baseball players from Michigan
Chattanooga Lookouts players
Elmira Pioneers players
Gloversville-Johnstown Glovers players
Major League Baseball catchers
Paris Red Peppers players
People from Romulus, Michigan
Springfield Browns players
Washington Senators (1901–1960) players